The 2016 Suruga Bank Championship was the ninth edition of the Suruga Bank Championship, the club football match co-organized by the Japan Football Association, the football governing body of Japan, CONMEBOL, the football governing body of South America, and J.League, the professional football league of Japan, between the winners of the previous season's J.League Cup and Copa Sudamericana.

The match was contested between Japanese team Kashima Antlers, the 2015 J.League Cup winners, and Colombian team Santa Fe, the 2015 Copa Sudamericana winners. It was hosted by Kashima Antlers at the Kashima Soccer Stadium in Kashima on 10 August 2016.

Santa Fe defeated Kashima Antlers 1–0 to win their first Suruga Bank Championship title, and their second international title following their 2015 Copa Sudamericana triumph.

Teams

Format
The Suruga Bank Championship was played as a single match, with the J.League Cup winners hosting the match. If tied at the end of regulation, extra time would not be played, and the penalty shoot-out would be used to determine the winner. A maximum of seven substitutions may be made during the match.

Match

References

External links
スルガ銀行チャンピオンシップ2016, Japan Football Association 
スルガ銀行チャンピオンシップ2016, J.League 
Copa Suruga Bank, CONMEBOL.com 

2016
2016 in Japanese football
2016 in South American football
Kashima Antlers matches
Independiente Santa Fe matches
2016 in Colombian football